The 1942 World Professional Basketball Tournament was the 4th edition of the World Professional Basketball Tournament. It was held in Chicago, Illinois, during the days of 8–12 March 1942 and featured 14 teams. It was won by the Oshkosh All-Stars who defeated the Detroit Eagles  43–41 in the championship game. The Long Island Grumman Flyers came in third after beating the Harlem Globetrotters 43–41 in the third-place game. Ed Riska of the Oshkosh All-Stars was named the tournaments Most Valuable Player. Gene Englund led all scorers with 54 points while Riska came second with 50.

Results

First round
8 March - Detroit Eagles 46, Toledo White Huts 29
8 March - Harlem Globetrotters 40, Hagerstown Conoco Oilers 33
8 March - Aberdeen Army Ordinance Training Center 56, Fort Wayne Zollner Pistons 42
9 March - Chicago Bruins 56, Detroit AAA 46
9 March - Sheboygan Redskins 34, Columbus Bobb Chevrolets 26
9 March - New York Rens 55, Michigan City Steelers 37
9 March - Oshkosh All-Stars 44, Davenport Central Turner Rockets 29
9 March - Long Island Grumman Flyers 54, Indianapolis Kautskys 32

Quarter-finals
9 March - Detroit Eagles 40, Aberdeen Army Ordinance Training Center 34
10 March - Harlem Globetrotters 37, Sheboygan Redskins 32
10 March - Long Island Grumman Flyers 48, Chicago Bruins 38
10 March - Oshkosh All-Stars 44, New York Rens 38

Semi-finals
11 March - Detroit Eagles 44, Long Island Grumman Flyers 43
11 March - Oshkosh All-Stars 48, Harlem Globetrotters 41

Third place game

Championship game

Individual awards

All-Tournament team
F – Buddy Jeannette, Detroit Eagles 
F – Moe Becker, Aberdeen Army Ordnance Training Center
F – Sonny Boswell, New York Rens
F – Bernie Price, Harlem Globetrotters
C – Jerry Bush, Detroit Eagles
C – Gene Englund, Oshkosh All-Stars
G – Dolly King, Long Island Grumman Flyers
G – Ed Milkovich, Hagerstown Conoco Oilers
G – Mickey Tierney, Chicago Bruins
G – Ed Riska, Oshkosh All-Stars (MVP)

References

External links
WPBT 1939-48 on apbr.org

World Professional Basketball Tournament